Aya or AYA may refer to:

Films
Aya (1990 film), an Australian film
Aya (2012 film), a short

Places
Aya, Miyazaki, a town in Japan
Aya Biosphere Reserve, Japan
Cape Aya, Black Sea coast, Ukraine
Aya or Agia (Meteora), a rock in Thessaly, Greece

People
Aya (queen), an Egyptian queen
Aya (given name), a given name (including a list of people, fictional characters and a mythological goddess)

Aya (British singer), British singer, songwriter and actress
Aya (Japanese singer), Japanese rock artist
Naoki "Aya" Okawa, guitarist of the Japanese group Psycho le Cému
Ibrahima Aya (born 1967), Malian writer
Ramzi Aya (born 1990), Italian footballer

Other uses
AYA, acronym meaning adolescent and young adult and used in oncology 
Aya (album), third studio album by French singer Aya Nakamura
AYA (band), Slovak rock band
Aya (Green Lantern), a character from DC Comics
Aya Group, a business conglomerate in Uganda
Association of Yale Alumni
American Youth Academy, a school in Tampa, Florida
Antranik Youth Association, Lebanon
Armenian Youth Association
 "AYA", a song named AYA made by a K-pop girl group Mamamoo

See also
Ayah, a verse in the Qur'an
Ayaka, name